Hazel Dell Township is a township in Pottawattamie County, Iowa, USA.

History
Hazel Dell Township was organized in 1873.

References

Townships in Pottawattamie County, Iowa
Townships in Iowa